Kirati Keawsombat, simply known as Pop is a Thai professional footballer who plays as a striker.

Club career
His career began in Assumption College Thonburi, on which he went to school. In 2007, he was hired by the former Thai Division 1 League side FC Royal Thai Army. After the descent of the association in 2008 he moved to FC TOT for only one season later, his coach Pongphan Wongsuwan to follow Buriram. Kirati went to Wuachon and scored a couple goals. In 2013, he played with PTT Rayong F.C. in the 2013 Thai Division 1 League.

International career

From 2005 to 2006 he was in the squad of the U-19 national team. He was in the squad AFF U-19 Youth Championship in 2005 and also in the squad, which struggled to qualify for the U-19 Asian Cup. The team failed to qualify for the final tournament at the end. Kirati however, was not taken into account. [1] Since 2009 he is both part of the cadre of U-23 and the men's team. For both teams it could have been recorded inserts. Kirati is in the squad for the 25th Southeast Asia Games. In the first match against Vietnam, he scored his first goal for the U-23rd. He was part of the 2010 AFF Suzuki Cup, 2012 AFF Suzuki Cup and the 2014 AFF Suzuki Cup.

Style of Play
Kirati is a striker who relies on his strength, or commonly known as a target man. His stocky physique allows him to win most headers and help teammates score goals. Tatchakorn is also known for his high work rate.

International goals

Honours

Clubs
Buriram PEA
Thai League 1 (1) : 2011
Thai FA Cup (1) : 2011
Thai League Cup (1) : 2011

Uthai Thani
Thai League 3 (1): 2021–22
Thai League 3 Northern Region (1): 2021–22

International
Thailand
 ASEAN Football Championship (1) : 2014

References

External links
 
 Goal.com 
 Players Profile - info.thscore.com
 

1987 births
Living people
Kirati Keawsombat
Kirati Keawsombat
Association football forwards
Kirati Keawsombat
Kirati Keawsombat
Kirati Keawsombat
Kirati Keawsombat
Kirati Keawsombat
Kirati Keawsombat
Kirati Keawsombat
Kirati Keawsombat
Kirati Keawsombat
Footballers at the 2010 Asian Games
Kirati Keawsombat